The European pine vole (Microtus subterraneus), also known as the common pine vole, is a species of rodent in the family Cricetidae. It is native to much of Europe and parts of Asia.

References

Further reading
Musser, G. G. and M. D. Carleton. 2005. Superfamily Muroidea. pp. 894–1531 in Mammal Species of the World a Taxonomic and Geographic Reference. D. E. Wilson and D. M. Reeder eds. Johns Hopkins University Press, Baltimore.

Microtus
Mammals described in 1936
Taxonomy articles created by Polbot